Predhiman Krishan Kaw (15 January 1948 – 18 June 2017) was an Indian plasma physicist. He had been the founding director of the Institute for Plasma Research and served the institute as the director from 1986 to 2012.

Biography 
Kaw was born on 15 January 1948 in Srinagar (Jammu and Kashmir), India. He matriculated from Punjab University (1958) and completed his M.Sc. from Agra University in 1964. He received PhD from Indian Institute of Technology, Delhi in 1966 under Supervision of Prof. M. S. Sodha, and was the first Ph.D. from the Indian Institute of Technology, Delhi. Kaw received his Ph.D. at the age of 18, following which he completed his PostDoc at Princeton University. He had been the founding director of the Institute for Plasma Research and served the institute as the director from 1986 to 2012. He was awarded the prestigious Padma Shri award, India's fourth-highest honor, in 1985 and Shanti Swarup Bhatnagar Award in 1986. On 28 December 2016, he was awarded the Subrahmanyan Chandrasekhar Prize of Plasma Physics for his seminal contributions in the areas of laser-plasma interactions, strongly coupled dusty plasmas, and turbulence, nonlinear effect in magnetic fusion devices. He is also a recipient of the 2008 TWAS Prize.

Professional details

Selected articles and talks
  PK Kaw, "Fusion power, who needs it?" (pdf format), Current Science, 10 July 1993, 65(01) 20 (web format)

References

External links
Institute for Plasma Research, Gujarat, India
Prof. PK Kaw Home Page
Predhiman Kaw, founder of India’s fusion program and former PPPL physicist -- News

1948 births
2017 deaths
20th-century Indian physicists
Kashmiri people
Recipients of the Padma Shri in science & engineering
IIT Delhi alumni
People from Srinagar
Scientists from Jammu and Kashmir
TWAS laureates
Indian plasma physicists
Fellows of the American Physical Society